Salem's Lot is a 1975 horror novel  by American author Stephen King. It was his second published novel. The story involves a writer named Ben Mears who returns to the town of Jerusalem's Lot (or 'Salem's Lot for short) in Maine, where he lived from the age of five through nine, only to discover that the residents are becoming vampires. The town is revisited in the short stories "Jerusalem's Lot" and "One for the Road", both from King's story collection Night Shift (1978). The novel was nominated for the World Fantasy Award in 1976 and the Locus Award for the All-Time Best Fantasy Novel in 1987.

In two separate interviews in the 1980s, King said that, of all his books, Salem's Lot was his favorite. In his June 1983 Playboy interview, the interviewer mentioned that because it was his favorite, King was planning a sequel, but King has said on his website that because The Dark Tower series already continued the narrative in Wolves of the Calla and Song of Susannah, he felt there was no longer a need for a sequel. In 1987 he told Phil Konstantin in The Highway Patrolman magazine: "In a way it is my favorite story, mostly because of what it says about small towns. They are kind of a dying organism right now. The story seems sort of down home to me. I have a special cold spot in my heart for it!"

Salem's Lot has been adapted into a 1979 two-part miniseries directed by Tobe Hooper and a 2004 television miniseries directed by Mikael Salomon. A feature film adaptation directed by Gary Dauberman is currently in production.

The book is dedicated to King's daughter Naomi.

Plot
Ben Mears, a writer, has returned to Jerusalem's Lot, Maine after 25 years to try to write his next novel. He quickly becomes friends with high school teacher Matt Burke and strikes up a romantic relationship with Susan Norton, a young college graduate with ambitions of leaving town. Ben has returned to "the Lot" to write a book about the long-abandoned Marsten House, where he had a bad experience as a child when he saw a hanging ghost. He learns that the house—the former home of Depression-era hitman Hubert "Hubie" Marsten—has been purchased by Kurt Barlow, ostensibly an Austrian immigrant who has arrived in the Lot to open an antique furniture store. Barlow is supposedly on an extended buying trip; only his business partner, Richard Straker, is seen in public. The truth, however, is that Barlow is an ancient vampire and Straker is his human familiar.

The duo's arrival coincides with the disappearance of a young boy, Ralphie Glick, and the death of his 12-year-old brother, Danny, who becomes the town's first vampire turned by Barlow. Barlow also turns town dump custodian Dud Rogers and telephone repairman Corey Bryant. Danny turns other locals into vampires, including the graveyard digger, Mike Ryerson; a newborn baby, Randy McDougall; a man named Jack Griffen; and Danny's mother, Marjorie. Danny fails to turn his classmate Mark Petrie, who resists him by holding a plastic cross in Danny's face. To fight the spread of the new vampires, Ben and Susan are joined by Matt and his doctor, Jimmy Cody, along with Mark and the local priest, Father Callahan. Susan is captured by Barlow, who turns her. She is eventually staked through the heart by Ben.

When Father Callahan and Mark go to Mark's parents' house to explain the danger that the family is in, the power is suddenly cut off and Barlow appears. After killing Mark's parents, Barlow takes the boy hostage. Callahan pulls out his cross in an attempt to drive him off, and it works until Barlow challenges him to throw the cross away. Callahan, not having faith enough to do so, is soon overwhelmed by Barlow, who forces Callahan to drink his blood, making him "unclean". When Callahan tries to re-enter his church, he receives an electric shock, preventing him from going inside. Defeated, Callahan leaves Jerusalem's Lot.

Matt suffers a fatal heart attack while Jimmy is killed when he falls from a rigged staircase and is impaled by knives set up by the vampires. Ben and Mark destroy Barlow, but are lucky to escape with their lives and are forced to leave the town to the now-leaderless vampires. Ben returns the following day to retrieve and bury the bodies of Jimmy and Mark's parents in a clearing behind the Petrie residence. The novel's prologue, which is set shortly after the end of the story proper, describes Ben and Mark's flight across the country to a seaside town in Mexico, where they attempt to recover from their ordeal. Mark is received into the Catholic Church by a friendly local priest and confesses for the first time what they have experienced. An epilogue reveals the two return to the town a year later, intending to renew the battle. Ben, knowing that there are too many hiding places for the vampires, starts a brush fire in the nearby woods with the intent of destroying the town.

Background
While teaching a course on fantasy and science fiction for students at Hampden Academy, King was inspired by Dracula, one of the books covered in the class. "One night over supper I wondered aloud what would happen if Dracula came back in the twentieth century, to America. 'He'd probably be run over by a Yellow Cab on Park Avenue and killed,' my wife said. [In the Introduction to the 2004 audiobook recording that Stephen King read himself, he says it was he who said, "Probably he'd land in New York and be killed by a Taxi Cab, like Margaret Mitchell in Atlanta" and that it was his wife who suggested a rural setting for the book.] That closed the discussion, but in the following days, my mind kept returning to the idea. It occurred to me that my wife was probably right – if the legendary Count came to New York, that is. But if he were to show up in a sleepy little country town, what then? I decided I wanted to find out, so I wrote Salem's Lot, which was originally titled Second Coming."  Though King initially planned to title the novel Second Coming, he changed it to Jerusalem's Lot on the advice of his wife, novelist Tabitha King, who thought the original title sounded too much like a "bad sex story." King's publishers then shortened it to the current title, thinking the author's choice sounded too religious. King's paperback publisher bought the book for $550,000.

King expands on this thought of the 20th-century vampire in his essay for Adeline Magazine, "On Becoming a Brand Name" (February 1980): "I began to turn the idea over in my mind, and it began to coalesce into a possible novel. I thought it would make a good one, if I could create a fictional town with enough prosaic reality about it to offset the comic-book menace of a bunch of vampires."  Yet the inspirations for Salem's Lot go back even farther. In Danse Macabre, a non-fiction overview of the modern horror genre, King recalls a dream he had when he was eight years old. In the dream, he saw the body of a hanged man dangling from the arm of a scaffold on a hill. "The corpse bore a sign: ROBERT BURNS. But when the wind caused the corpse to turn in the air, I saw that it was my face - rotted and picked by birds, but obviously mine. And then the corpse opened its eyes and looked at me. I woke up screaming, sure that a dead face would be leaning over me in the dark. Sixteen years later, I was able to use the dream as one of the central images in my novel Salem's Lot. I just changed the name of the corpse to Hubie Marsten."

King first wrote of Jerusalem's Lot in the short story "Jerusalem's Lot", penned in college, but not published until years later in the short story collection Night Shift.  In a 1969 installment of "The Garbage Truck", a column King wrote for the University of Maine at Orono's campus newspaper, King foreshadowed the coming of Salem's Lot by writing: "In the early 1800s a whole sect of Shakers, a rather strange, religious persuasion at best, disappeared from their village (Jeremiah's Lot) in Vermont. The town remains uninhabited to this day."

Politics during the time influenced King's writing of the story. The corruption in the government was a significant factor in the inspiration of the story. Of this he recalls,

Illustrated edition

In 2005, Centipede Press released a deluxe limited edition of Salem's Lot with black and white photographs by Jerry Uelsmann and the two short stories "Jerusalem's Lot" and "One for the Road", as well as over 50 pages of deleted material. The book was limited to 315 copies, each signed by Stephen King and Jerry Uelsmann. The book included a ribbon marker, head and tail bands, three-piece cloth construction, and a slipcase. An unsigned hardcover edition limited to 600 copies, was later released. Both the signed and unsigned editions were sold out. In an interview with the printed trade journal Fine Books & Collections, King said of the illustrated folio version of his Salem's Lot, "I think it's beautiful!" A trade edition was later released.

Critical reception
In the short story anthology A Century of Great Suspense Stories, editor Jeffery Deaver noted that King

Adaptations

Film and television 
In 1979, Salem's Lot was adapted to a two-part television miniseries of the same name that aired on CBS. It stars David Soul as Ben Mears, and was nominated for three Primetime Emmy Awards and an Edgar Award. It was filmed on location in Ferndale, California. A truncated two-hour version was also released in cinemas in some countries.

In 1987, Larry Cohen directed the film A Return to Salem's Lot. Marketed as a sequel to the 1979 miniseries, the film does not include any of the original characters despite using the image of Barlow from the 1979 version on the poster. 

In 2004, TNT premiered a new television adaptation of Salem's Lot starring Rob Lowe as Ben Mears, which also received a Primetime Emmy nomination.

In 2018, the eighth episode of the Castle Rock TV series (centered around the fictional town created by King) entitled "Past Perfect" was aired, which briefly showed a present-day bus stop in Jerusalem's Lot. A traffic sign indicated that the town was located 24 miles away from Castle Rock. The Marsten House is featured in the show's second season.

The 2021 Epix television series Chapelwaite, starring Adrien Brody and Emily Hampshire, is based on the short story "Jerusalem's Lot", a prequel to Salem's Lot set in the 19th Century.

A theatrical film adaptation of Salem's Lot, from New Line Cinema, was announced in April 2019, with Gary Dauberman set to write and direct, and James Wan attached to produce. Filming began in Boston in September 2021. Lewis Pullman stars as Ben Mears, while Spencer Treat Clark and Makenzie Leigh will co-star as Mike Ryerson and Susan Norton respectively. The film was originally scheduled to be released in cinemas on September 9, 2022, but was pushed back to April 21, 2023 before being pulled from Warner Bros. release schedule indefinitely.

Radio 

The novel was adapted in the U.K. as a radio drama on BBC Radio 4 in 1995.

References

External links

 
1975 American novels
Novels by Stephen King
American horror novels
American vampire novels
Novels set in Maine
Doubleday (publisher) books
Fiction set in 1975
Fiction set in 1976
American novels adapted into television shows
American novels adapted into films
Novels adapted into radio programs
Third-person narrative novels